United Kingdom is the fourth studio album by American indie rock band American Music Club. It was released exclusively in the United Kingdom in 1989 on Frontier Records and Demon Records. The album was recorded primarily for the country, where the band had a larger following than in their native United States, and consists of a mixture of studio and live tracks. United Kingdom was produced by Tom Mallon, who also produced the band's previous three LPs, The Restless Stranger, Engine and California.

United Kingdom contains the song "Kathleen", the most obvious of many that Mark Eitzel has composed about his long-term muse, Kathleen Burns.

Track listing

Personnel
American Music Club
 Mark Eitzel – vocals, guitar
 Tom Mallon – bass, production
 Mike Simms – drums
 Vudi – guitar, accordion, backing vocals

Additional musicians
 Charles Gillingham – piano
 Bruce Kaphan – pedal steel

Artwork and design
 Kathleen Burns – cover photography

References

1989 albums
American Music Club albums
Frontier Records albums